Saravan (Balochi and , also Romanized as Sarāvān; formerly, Shastoon) is a city in and the capital of Saravan County, Sistan and Baluchestan Province, Iran. At the 2006 census, its population was 58,652, in 10,078 families.

Saravan lies in the Iranian Balochistan, close to the international border of Pakistan. The inhabitants of the city are Baloch and speak the Balochi language.

It is the center of Saravan County. The city lies in a long valley in the south of Masheked and north of Makran.

Earthquake
In winter of 2013 a major earthquake with a magnitude of 7.8 Richter occurred near the city of Saravan.

Attacks on public figures
Saravan is the location of many attacks, presumably by Baloch insurgents.
 Justice Judge Ebrahim Karimi was assassinated
 Rare suicide bombing kills four
 October 26, 2013: About 20 Iranian border guards are killed in an attack by rebel Baloch bandits near Pakistan border.

References

Populated places in Saravan County
Cities in Sistan and Baluchestan Province